Sport climbing at the 2005 Asian Indoor Games was held in Suphanburi Sports Complex, Suphanburi, Thailand from 14 November to 16 November 2005.

Medalists

Men

Women

Medal table

Results

Men

Lead
14–16 November

Speed

Qualification
15 November

Knockout round
16 November

Women

Lead
14–16 November

Speed

Qualification
15 November

Knockout round
16 November

References

 2005 Asian Indoor Games official website
 Chinese Mountaineering Association

2005 Asian Indoor Games events
Sport climbing at the Asian Indoor Games
2005 in sport climbing